Caspian Port is a seaport located in Anzali Trade-Industrial Freezone, Gilan Province, Iran.

References

Transport in Iran
Ports and harbours of Iran
Port cities and towns of the Caspian Sea